Stuart Ewen (born 1945) is a New York-based author, historian and lecturer on media, consumer culture, and the compliance profession.  He is also a Distinguished Professor at  Hunter College and the City University of New York Graduate Center, in the departments of History, Sociology and Media Studies. He is the author of six books. Under the pen name Archie Bishop, Ewen has also worked as a graphic artist, photographer, pamphleteer, and agitprop activist for many years.

As a young man, in 1964 and early 1965, Ewen was a field secretary for the civil rights organization the Student Nonviolent Coordinating Committee (SNCC). After working as a volunteer in the Freedom House in Columbus, Mississippi, he became part of the SNCC staff, earning the standard pay of $9.66 per week. After working in Columbus, he and Isaac Coleman, who was the project director, opened up a new field office in Tupelo, Mississippi. In 1966, Ewen was one of the founding editors of an early underground newspaper, Connections, in Madison, Wisconsin, where he was a student.

In 1989, his book All Consuming Images provided the basis for Bill Moyers' four-part award-winning series, "The Public Mind."  In 2004, another of his books, PR! A Social History of Spin, was the foundation of a four-part BBC series, "The Century of the Self," produced by Adam Curtis. "PR!" also provided the foundation for the 2018 French documentary, "Propaganda: La fabrique du consentement," directed by Jimmy Leipold and produced by Arte Television and INAfr. It was also the foundation of a 2020 Russian television documentary, "Стюарт Юэн. PR: как создается правда?"

Ewen has become a spokesman against violations of academic freedom in the period since 9/11, and is the Chairman of the Board of Directors of the Frederic Ewen Academic Freedom Center at NYU, which is named after his great uncle, a professor at Brooklyn College who was forced to resign after refusing to testify before HUAC.

Personal life 
He was married to Elizabeth Ewen (1943-2012), a Distinguished Teaching Professor in the Department of American Studies at the State University of New York at Old Westbury. He has two sons, Paul Ewen and Sam Ewen, both of New York, and two grandchildren. Sam Ewen is currently a lecturer at Hunter College, Teaching media studies.

Works

Books 
Captains of Consciousness: Advertising and the Social Roots of the Consumer Culture. New York: McGraw-Hill (1976). .
Channels of Desire: Mass Images and the Shaping of American Consciousness (co-authored with Elizabeth Ewen). New York: McGraw-Hill (1982). .
All Consuming Images: The Politics of Style in Contemporary Culture. New York: Basic Books (1988). .
PR!: A Social History of Spin. New York: Basic Books (1996). .
The New Media Reader: Introduction to Media Studies Critical Texts. Boston: Houghton Mifflin Company (2001). .
Typecasting: On the Arts and Sciences of Human Inequality (co-authored with Elizabeth Ewen). New York: Seven Stories Press (2006). .
Revised ed. (2008). .

Articles and essays 
 "Mass Culture, Narcissism and the Moral Economy of War". Telos 44 (Summer 1980). New York: Telos Press
Crystallizing Public Opinion (Edward Bernays, Introduction by Stuart Ewen), New York: IG Publishing, 2011.

References

External links 
 Appearances on C-SPAN
"PR, Social Control and Revolt: An interview with Stuart Ewen," State of Nature, March 2009
 An interview with Stuart Ewen by David Barsamian, Z Magazine, May 2000.
"The Stay Free Interview" Part I Stuart Ewen talks with Stay Free magazine about his history of hype, the public relations industry, saving the planet, etc.
"Stereotype and Society" Informative, sometimes humorous website expanding on issues raised in Ewen and Ewen's Typecasting, On the Arts and Sciences of Human Inequality.

Anti-corporate activists
20th-century American historians
American male non-fiction writers
21st-century American historians
Historians of the United States
Historians of public relations
American public relations people
Public relations theorists
Advertising theorists
Mass media theorists
Propaganda theorists
Graduate Center, CUNY faculty
Hunter College faculty
State University of New York at Old Westbury faculty
1945 births
Living people
20th-century American male writers